was a Japanese politician and bureaucrat, and briefly served as interim Prime Minister of Japan in 1936.

Biography
Born in Ōita Prefecture, Gotō was a graduate of the Law School of Tokyo Imperial University in 1909. During his early career in the 1920s, he worked in the Home Ministry, and was Director of Administration within the office of the Governor-General of Taiwan.

In the 1930s, Gotō was appointed to a seat in the House of Peers in the Diet of Japan. He served as Minister of Agriculture, Forestry and Fisheries between 1932 and 1934 in the cabinet of Prime Minister Makoto Saitō, and was later Home Minister in the cabinet of Keisuke Okada.

Immediately after the 26 February Incident, Gotō served as acting Prime Minister while Prime Minister Okada was in hiding from his attempted assassins. He was chairman of the Taisei Yokusankai from 1941–1943, and under the administration of Hideki Tōjō, he served as a Minister of State.

Arrested by the American occupation authorities after the surrender of Japan, he was held in Sugamo Prison in Tokyo awaiting prosecution for war crimes, but was released in 1948 without trial. From April 1953 to June 1959, he served as a member of House of Councillors in the post-war Diet of Japan. He was appointed a Grand Cordon of the Order of the Rising Sun in November 1971.

Honours 
From the corresponding article in the Japanese Wikipedia
Grand Cordon of the Order of the Sacred Treasure (24 April 1934; Third Class: 26 August 1926; Fourth Class: 1 November 1920)
Medal of Honor with Blue Ribbon (3 November 1960)
Grand Cordon of the Order of the Rising Sun (3 November 1971; Fifth Class: 1 April 1916; Sixth Class: 19 January 1916)

References

1884 births
1980 deaths
20th-century prime ministers of Japan
People from Ōita Prefecture
Prime Ministers of Japan
Foreign ministers of Japan
Government ministers of Japan
Members of the House of Peers (Japan)
Members of the House of Councillors (Japan)
University of Tokyo alumni
Imperial Rule Assistance Association politicians
Grand Cordons of the Order of the Rising Sun
20th-century Japanese politicians
Ministers of Home Affairs of Japan